Mid-Western Regional Hospital may refer to various hospitals in Ireland:

Mid-Western Regional Hospital, Limerick
Mid-Western Regional Hospital, Ennis
Mid-Western Regional Hospital, Nenagh